Christopher W. Wilson (1846 - September 12, 1916) was an Irish born recipient of the Medal of Honor who fought in the Union Army during the American Civil War.

Biography 
Wilson was born in 1846 in Ireland. Sometime between his birth and the start of the Civil War he immigrated to America. During the war he served as a private in the 73rd New York Infantry. He earned his medal on May 12, 1864 at the Battle of Spotsylvania Court House, Virginia in which he captured a Confederate flag. Wilson was presented his medal on December 30, 1898. He died on September 12, 1916 and is buried in The Evergreens Cemetery in Brooklyn, New York.

Medal of Honor Citation 
For extraordinary heroism on 12 May 1864, in action at Spotsylvania, Virginia. Private Wilson took the flag from the wounded Color Bearer and carried it in the charge over the Confederate works, in which charge he also captured the colors of the 56th Virginia (Confederate States of America) bringing off both flags in safety.

References 

1846 births
1916 deaths
American Civil War recipients of the Medal of Honor
Irish-born Medal of Honor recipients
Irish soldiers in the United States Army